metaSAN is cross-platform Storage Area Network (SAN) management software developed and sold by Tiger Technology. The product ceased to be developed by the company from 2014, however it will be supported until the end of 2016.

Technology

metaSAN enables one to share one (or more) physical or virtual disk devices with multiple hosts using Fibre Channel, iSCSI, Ethernet, or InfiniBand interconnect. Every computer participating in the SAN could read and write to the same storage volume (and folder) at the same time.

metaSAN is not a file system but is a distributed lock manager for existing NTFS or HFS+ file systems. It was hardware agnostic and worked with off-the-shelf storage and networking components.  It offered per-node bandwidth control, which aimed to enable fair distribution of the available storage bandwidth. In a cross-platform setup, metaSAN provided the file-system translation services that allowed Mac, Windows and Linux workstations to transparently access non-native volumes.

To arbitrate accesses to the shared storage device(s), one computer was elected master of the SAN.  This computer became the metadata controller (MDC).  Other computers were clients of the SAN.  They communicated and sent metadata requests to the MDC over LAN.   Once request had been acknowledged, clients could access the storage device directly.  In a metaSAN setup, any member of the SAN could act as MDC.  By default, the first computer to boot became the MDC but it was possible to define priorities or assign a dedicated computer for this task.

metaSAN has been superseded by Tiger Store http://www.tiger-technology.com/products/tiger-series/tiger-store/

References

External links
 Tiger Technology Legacy Products
 Tiger Store

Shared disk file systems
2013 software